Pierceland is a village in the Canadian province of Saskatchewan within the Rural Municipality of Beaver River No. 622 and Census Division No. 17. It is north of the Beaver River on Saskatchewan Highway 55.

History 
Pierceland incorporated as a village on January 1, 1973.

Demographics 

Notable people

Grant Erickson (born April 28, 1947, in Pierceland) is a retired professional ice hockey player who played 266 games in the World Hockey Association and six games in the National Hockey League.
 Lorna Heiber born April 7, 1960, was the first woman to lead an Aboriginal Government in Saskatchewan. She served as Acting President of the Metis Nation Saskatchewan in 2004 (under the name Lorna Docken). Her son Joey Stylez is a well known musician who has received many honors and has been named one of Canada's top rappers of all time by the Canadian Broadcasting Corporation.
 Melvin “Mel” Coleman Saddle bronc Rodeo Competitor.

See also 
 Pierceland Central School
 List of communities in Saskatchewan
 Villages of Saskatchewan

References

External links

Villages in Saskatchewan
Beaver River No. 622, Saskatchewan
Division No. 17, Saskatchewan